Ángel, la diva y yo is a 1999 Argentine drama film directed Pablo Nisenson, and written by Nisenson and José Pablo Feinmann. It stars José Soriano, Esther Goris, Boy Olmi and Florencia Peña. The film was partly funded by INCAA.

Synopsis
In Buenos Aires, at the end of the 20th century, a documentarian, anxious about his future, is about to realize his "last act" when a mysterious package is delivered to him: a rusty 35 mm film canister, an envelope stuffed with cash, and a request that he rescue the greatest Argentine film director in history from oblivion. Together with his crew, the filmmaker tries to piece together the puzzle.

Cast

 José "Pepe" Soriano as Angel Ferreyros
 Esther Goris as Diva
 Boy Olmi as Julián Armendáriz
 Florencia Peña as Ana
 Ricardo Sendra as Miguel
 Osvaldo Bayer as Escritor
 Max Berliner as Merayo
 Alberto Busaid as Funes
 Claudio España as Crítico
 José Pablo Feinmann as Filósofo

 Miguel Fontes as Payaso
 Celina Fux as Vecina
 Patricia Hart as Santa
 Diana Ingro as Actriz famosa
 Augusto Larreta as Loco
 Miguel Padilla as Policia
 Jorge Román
 Salvador Sammaritano as Esayista
 Andrés Turnes as Empresario
 Emilio Vieyra as Mendigo

Distribution
The film was first presented at the Mar del Plata Film Festival in November 1999, where it was acclaimed as one of the best Ibero-American films of that year. It then opened wide in Argentina on September 21, 2000.

Awards
Wins
 Mar del Plata Film Festival: Best Ibero-American Film, Pablo Nisenson; Best Screenplay, Pablo Nisenson and José Pablo Feinmann; 1999.

Nominations
 Argentine Film Critics Association Awards: Silver Condor; Best Original Screenplay, José Pablo Feinmann and Pablo Nisenson; 2001.

References

External links
 
 Ángel, la diva y yo at the cinenacional.com 
 

1999 films
1999 drama films
Argentine independent films
1990s Spanish-language films
1999 independent films
Argentine drama films
1990s Argentine films